The Rahar (or Raher, Rad, Rahad, Rar, Radh) is a Clan (gotra) of Jats found in Rajasthan, Haryana, Punjab, Madhya Pradesh states of India.

Origin of name 
It is very likely that King Radda (रड़्ड़) may have given name to Rad (राड़) clan (Radda→Rad (gotra)) as we get Jat (जाट) from Jatta (जट्ट) in Sanskrit.

Some historians believe that Rad people were always ready for war and one of the best Warriors of Jat Community hence the name as Rad (राड़) in Rajasthani Language means war. 
They have brotherhood with Brar as name of both gotra are so similar. As some historians says these both gotra are same but due to Language pronunciation looks different.

Rahars in Punjab 
Dr Pema Ram writes that after the invasion of Alexander the Great in 326 BC, the Jats of Sind and Punjab migrated to Haryana & Rajasthan. They built tanks, wells and Bawadis near their habitations. The tribes migrated were: Shivis, Yaudheyas, Malavas, Madras etc. The Shivi tribe which came from Ravi and Beas Rivers founded towns like Sheo, Sojat, Siwana, Shergarh, Shivganj etc. This area was adjoining to Sindh and mainly inhabited by Jats. The Jats of Gotra Rad and Kath came to Marwar. Kath came from Ravi River.

References 

Jat clans
Gotras